The 4th district of the Iowa Senate is located in Northwestern Iowa. It is currently composed of Emmet, Hancock, Kossuth, Winnebago and Wright counties.

Current elected officials
Dennis Guth is the senator currently representing the 4th District.

The area of the 4th District contains two Iowa House of Representatives districts:
The 7th District (represented by Henry Stone)
The 8th District (represented by Terry Baxter)

The district is also located in Iowa's 4th congressional district, which is represented by U.S. Representative Randy Feenstra.

Past senators
The district has previously been represented by:

William F. Coolbaugh and Lyman Cook, 1856–1859
Nathan Udell, 1860–1867
Madison M. Walden, 1868–1869
W. F. Vermillion, 1870–1871
Edward J. Gault, 1872–1875
Joshua Miller, 1876–1877
Henry L. Dashiell, 1878–1879
David M. Clark, 1880–1883
Lewis Miles, 1884–1887
Warren S. Dungan, 1888–1891
Lester W. Lewis, 1892–1895
Harvey L. Byers, 1896–1899
Alexander Mardis, 1900–1903
R. A. Hasselquist, 1904–1907
J. A. McKlveen, 1907–1908
George McCulloch, 1909–1912
John H. Darrah, 1913–1916
Karl M. LeComte, 1917–1920
James F. Johnston, 1921–1924
A. G. Dotts, 1925–1918
John W. Kent, 1929–1932
John H. Judd, 1933–1934
Joseph E. Doze, 1935–1936
H. V. Levis, 1937–1940
Clarence L. Clark, 1941–1944
J.A. Newsome, 1945–1948
Pearl W. McMurry, 1949–1950
Ray Fletcher, 1951–1952
W. C. Stuart, 1953–1962
Howard Vincent, 1963–1964
Franklin S. Main, 1965–1968
Quentin V. Anderson, 1969–1970
H. L. Ollenburg, 1971–1972
Berl E. Priebe, 1973–1982
Richard P. Vande Hoef, 1983–1992
John P. Kibbie, 1993–2012
Dennis Guth, 2013–present

See also
Iowa General Assembly
Iowa Senate

References

04